Koiwai (written: 小岩井 lit "small rock well") is a Japanese surname. Notable people with the surname include:

Eichi Karl Koiwai (1920–2009), American judoka
, Japanese voice actress
, Japanese figure skater

Fictional characters
, titular character of the manga series Yotsuba&!

See also
Koiwai Station, a railway station in Takizawa, Iwate Prefecture, Japan

Japanese-language surnames